The Red Salmon Complex was a wildfire that burned  in Humboldt, Trinity, and Siskiyou County in Northern California during the 2020 California wildfire season. On July 27, lightning strikes in the Trinity Alps Wilderness started two fires, the Salmon Fire and the Red Fire, which eventually merged. As the fire grew, hazardous smoke levels surrounded Forks of Salmon, Orleans, Yreka, and Weed.

Timeline 
The fire was first reported  on July 27, 2020. It was caused due to lightning strikes in July and August 2020 in California. The fire's containment process was slow, only reaching 5% containment within 10 days, and wasn't contained until November 17. Cooler weather stopped the growth of the fire, which led to its containment in November.

Impact 
The fires have devastated the air quality in Siskiyou County, and can be hazardous to some people, and Forks of Salmon was evacuated. Forests like Six Rivers, Shasta-Trinity and Klamath national forests also had a lot of land burnt down by the complex, and therefore, temporarily closed.

See also 
2020 California wildfires
August Complex fire

References 

2020 California wildfires
Wildfires in Humboldt County, California
Wildfires in Trinity County, California
Wildfires in Siskiyou County, California
Shasta-Trinity National Forest
Klamath National Forest
Six Rivers National Forest